JIR may refer to:
 JiR, a Monte Carlo-based motorcycle racing 
  Jewish Institute of Religion
 Journal of Interpretation Research
 Journal of Irreproducible Results